The Sony Ericsson W850i is the first 3G sliding form factor mobile phone by Sony Ericsson, introduced in Q2 2006. It is a member of their Walkman line. The phone made its first public appearance in the 2006 movie The Da Vinci Code, months before its release. It is similar mechanically to the Sony Ericsson K800i, but differs in its form factor, memory card support of the Memory Stick PRO Duo instead of Memory Stick Micro, and the camera (2.0 megapixels instead of 3.2 for the K800i, and with some additional features removed)

The phone is available in Precious Black or Golden White and is configured for operator over the air (OTA) music download services and accepts popular music file formats including e-AAC+, and includes a 1 GB Memory Stick PRO Duo. The Golden White version has a gold Walkman logo on the back which the black version does not include.

The Walkman player contains Gracenote Mobile TrackID, which enables a user to record a few seconds of a song, either via the microphone or the in-built FM radio, and then with one click send that clip to the Gracenote worldwide music database which will identify the track and relay the information back to the phone. 

The model shares all the features the W880i has except the form factor and the inclusion of an FM radio and Photolight on this model.

There is a non-3G version of the W850i called W830c.

Hardware and Software 
The Sony Ericsson W850, released in Q2 2006, has a TFT 240×320 display packed in a 116 gram slider body. It was released in two colours (Precious Black and Golden White) and is capable of showing eight lines of text on its two inch display. It also has a fixed internal antenna.

The software also comes equipped with basic utilities like a stop watch and calculator.

Cameras
The phone features both a rear camera and a front-facing camera. The rear camera two megapixel can record up to 320×240 videos along with accompanying audio. The rear camera also has an LED flash.

See also
 Sony Ericsson
 List of Sony Ericsson products
 Walkman

References

External links

 Sony Ericsson W850i Product Page

Reviews
 Review by Mobile-Review 
 Review by iMobile.com.au
 CNET Reviews: Asia, Australia, U.K. and U.S.A.

Mobile phones introduced in 2006
W850
Mobile phones with infrared transmitter